Cteniloricaria maculata is a species of armored catfish native to French Guiana and Suriname where it is found in the Maroni and Corantijn River basins.  C. maculata lives in creeks and rapids where the vegetation is poor, the water is clear and well-oxygenated and shallow (less than ), with sandy to rocky substrate. This species grows to a length of  SL.

References 

 

Harttiini
Fish described in 1971
Fish of French Guiana
Fish of Suriname